Rusk County Airport  is a county-owned public-use airport in Rusk County, Wisconsin, United States. It is located four nautical miles (7 km) northeast of the central business district of Ladysmith, Wisconsin. 
It is included in the Federal Aviation Administration (FAA) National Plan of Integrated Airport Systems for 2021–2025, in which it is categorized as a local general aviation facility.

Although many U.S. airports use the same three-letter location identifier for the FAA and IATA, this facility is assigned RCX by the FAA but has no designation from the IATA.

Facilities and aircraft 
It has two asphalt paved runways: 14/32 is 4,001 by 75 feet (1,220 x 23 m) and 1/19 is 3,199 by 75 feet (975 x 23 m).
The Rusk County NDB navaid, (RCX) frequency 356 kHz, is located on the field.

For the 12-month period ending July 23, 2020, the airport had 8,070 aircraft operations, an average of 22 per day: 90% general aviation, 10% air taxi and less than 1% military. In February 2023, there were 19 aircraft based at this airport: 18 single-engine and 1 multi-engine.

See also
 List of airports in Wisconsin

References

External links 
 Airport page at Rusk County website
  at Wisconsin DOT
 

Airports in Wisconsin
Buildings and structures in Rusk County, Wisconsin